Sonny & Cher's Greatest Hits is the second compilation album by American pop duo Sonny & Cher, released in 1968 by Atlantic/Atco Records.

Album information
The album was released in 1968 and did not enter the album charts.

Sonny & Cher's Greatest Hits contained Sonny and Cher's hit songs from their three studio albums and their soundtrack album Good Times.
It contained "Plastic Man", written by Bono and previously released as a single in 1967. Like the previous compilation, it didn't contain their first hit "Baby Don't Go" released on the Reprise Records label.

The original Sonny & Cher's Greatest Hits compilation album remains unreleased on compact disc, but has since been available as a digital download on music sites such as Spotify.

Track listing

All songs written by Sonny Bono, unless otherwise noted.

Side A
"The Beat Goes On" - 3:23
"Let It Be Me" (Gilbert Bécaud, Mann Curtis, P. Delanoë) - 2:25
"What Now My Love" (Carl Sigman, Gilbert Bécaud, Pierre Delanoë) - 3:28
"It's Gonna Rain" – 2:23
"Living For You" - 3:30

Side B
"I Got You Babe" - 3:11
"Monday" - 2:55
"Just You" - 3:36
"Laugh At Me" - 2:50
"Love Don't Come" - 3:05

Side C
"Little Man" - 3:15
"A Beautiful Story" - 2:52
"Sing C'est La Vie" (Sonny Bono, Charles Greene, Brian Stone) - 3:39
"I Look For You" - 2:40
"So Fine" (Johnny Otis) - 2:30

Side D
"It's The Little Things" - 3:31
"But You're Mine" - 3:02
"Podunk" - 2:53
"Don't Talk to Strangers" - 2:46
"Plastic Man" - 3:34

Credits

Personnel
Main vocals: Cher
Main vocals: Sonny Bono

Production
Sonny Bono: Producer and arranged

References

1968 greatest hits albums
Sonny & Cher albums
Albums arranged by Sonny Bono
Albums produced by Sonny Bono
Atco Records compilation albums
Atlantic Records compilation albums